Julian Love (born March 19, 1998) is an American football safety for the Seattle Seahawks of the National Football League (NFL). He played college football at Notre Dame.

Early years
Love attended Nazareth Academy in La Grange Park, Illinois. As a senior in 2015, he was the Chicago Sun-Times Football Player of the Year after recording 92 tackles on defense and 1,067 rushing yards and 18 touchdowns on offense. Love committed to the University of Notre Dame to play college football.

College career
As a true freshman at Notre Dame in 2016, Love played in 12 games with eight starts and recorded 45 tackles and one interception. As a sophomore in 2017, he started all 13 games, recording 68 tackles and three interceptions. Love returned as a starter his junior year in 2018.  On January 4, 2019, Love announced that he would forgo his final year of eligibility and declare for the 2019 NFL Draft.

Professional career

New York Giants
Love was drafted by the New York Giants with the 108th pick in the fourth round of the 2019 NFL Draft.

In Week 12 of the 2019 season against the Chicago Bears, Love recorded his first career interception off a pass thrown by Mitchell Trubisky and returned it for 30 yards in the 19–14 loss.

In Week 2 of the 2020 season against the Chicago Bears, Love recorded his second career interception off another pass thrown by Trubisky during the 17–13 loss.

Seattle Seahawks
On March 17, 2023, Love signed a two-year, $12 million contract with the Seattle Seahawks.

References

External links
New York Giants bio
Notre Dame Fighting Irish bio

1998 births
Living people
People from Westchester, Illinois
Players of American football from Illinois
Sportspeople from Cook County, Illinois
American football cornerbacks
Notre Dame Fighting Irish football players
All-American college football players
New York Giants players
Seattle Seahawks players